Debovka is a rural locality (a village) in Taptykovsky Selsoviet, Ufimsky District, Bashkortostan, Russia. The population was 49 as of 2010. There is 1 street.

Geography 
Debovka is located 32 km southwest of Ufa (the district's administrative centre) by road. Osorgino is the nearest rural locality.

References 

Rural localities in Ufimsky District